Tariq ol Eslam Rural District is a rural district (dehestan) in the Central District of Nahavand County, Hamadan Province, Iran. At the 2006 census, its population was 13,956, in 3,603 families. The rural district has 24 villages.

References 

Rural Districts of Hamadan Province
Nahavand County